Poslední propadne peklu is a Czech adventure film directed by Ludvík Ráža. It was released in 1982.

Cast
 Michaela Kudláčková as Magdalena
 Ivan Vyskočil as Matous Psík
 Bruno Oja as Hoff
 Luděk Munzar as Vanek
 Josef Karlík as Krystof
 Dagmar Veškrnová as Keruse
 Jiří Holý as Kasehrnek
 Petr Haničinec as Bartos
 Martin Růžek as Holoubek
 Boris Rösner as Sepp
 Josef Somr as Physicus
 Ota Sklenčka as Reeve
 Petr Oliva as Niklas
 Zdeněk Srstka as Bastl
 Miroslav Moravec as Podobaný

Production
Michaela Kudláčková said she broke her leg during filming. "That's when they shot the scene of the girl running through the battle. Mr. Ráza, the director, wanted to make it as dramatic as possible, so he made up the idea of a dead soldier falling on the girl from a passing car. Unfortunately, he didn't think it through. The stuntman was about six feet tall and I was only forty kilos with my bed... When he fell on me, my tibia "snapped" and I ended up with my leg in a cast." Kudlacková said it was complicated to finish the film, "Because we were filming in the spring and I didn't recover until the summer. So we had to wait until autumn, when nature looks similar. Over the summer, we did scenes where I'm sitting and there's no need for my legs to be visible."

References

External links
 

1982 films
1980s historical adventure films
1980s Czech-language films
Czech historical adventure films
Czechoslovak adventure films
1980s Czech films